Prince Józef Karol Lubomirski (1638–1702) was a Polish noble.

He was owner of Dubno, Wiśnicz, Tarnów and Zesław, Koniuszy of the Crown since 1683, Court Marshals of the Crown since 1692, Grand Marshal of the Crown in 1702, Starost of Sandomierz and Zator. He married the niece of John III Sobieski, Teofila Ludwika Zasławska; they separated due to constant quarrels and Józef's "nymphomaniacal excesses".

References 

Secular senators of the Polish–Lithuanian Commonwealth
1638 births
1702 deaths
Jozef Karol Lubomirski